Nicolas Bourbaki is the collective pseudonym of a group of mathematicians, predominantly French alumni of the École normale supérieure - PSL (ENS). Founded in 1934–1935, the Bourbaki group originally intended to prepare a new textbook in analysis. Over time the project became much more ambitious, growing into a large series of textbooks published under the Bourbaki name, meant to treat modern pure mathematics. The series is known collectively as the Éléments de mathématique (Elements of Mathematics), the group's central work. Topics treated in the series include set theory, abstract algebra, topology, analysis, Lie groups and Lie algebras.

Bourbaki was founded in response to the effects of the First World War which caused the death of a generation of French mathematicians; as a result, young university instructors were forced to use dated texts. While teaching at the University of Strasbourg, Henri Cartan complained to his colleague André Weil of the inadequacy of available course material, which prompted Weil to propose a meeting with others in Paris to collectively write a modern analysis textbook. The group's core founders were Cartan, Claude Chevalley, Jean Delsarte, Jean Dieudonné and Weil; others participated briefly during the group's early years, and membership has changed gradually over time. Although former members openly discuss their past involvement with the group, Bourbaki has a custom of keeping its current membership secret.

The group's name derives from the 19th century French general Charles-Denis Bourbaki, who had a career of successful military campaigns before suffering a dramatic loss in the Franco-Prussian War. The name was therefore familiar to early 20th-century French students. Weil remembered an ENS student prank in which an upperclassman posed as a professor and presented a "theorem of Bourbaki"; the name was later adopted.

The Bourbaki group holds regular private conferences for the purpose of drafting and expanding the Éléments. Topics are assigned to subcommittees, drafts are debated, and unanimous agreement is required before a text is deemed fit for publication. Although slow and labor-intensive, the process results in a work which meets the group's standards for rigour and generality. The group is also associated with the Séminaire Bourbaki, a regular series of lectures presented by members and non-members of the group, also published and disseminated as written documents. Bourbaki maintains an office at the ENS.

Nicolas Bourbaki was influential in 20th-century mathematics, particularly during the middle of the century when volumes of the Éléments appeared frequently. The group is noted among mathematicians for its rigorous presentation and for introducing the notion of a mathematical structure, an idea related to the broader, interdisciplinary concept of structuralism. Bourbaki's work informed the New Math, a trend in elementary math education during the 1960s. Although the group remains active, its influence is considered to have declined due to infrequent publication of new volumes of the Éléments. The collective's most recent publication appeared in 2019, treating spectral theory (and a further volume on the same topic is due in spring 2023).

Background

Charles-Denis Sauter Bourbaki was born on 22 April 1816 in Pau, France, to a family of Greek origin. He became a successful general during the era of Napoleon III, serving in the Crimean War and other conflicts. During the Franco-Prussian war however, Charles-Denis Bourbaki suffered a major defeat. At the time of the Siege of Metz, he was lured to Britain on false pretenses of a peace conference, and upon return to the continent he was tasked with lifting the Siege of Belfort, an effort which failed. Charles-Denis Bourbaki was forced to retreat with his army—the Armée de l'Est—across the Swiss border. The force was disarmed by the Swiss, and the general unsuccessfully attempted suicide. Charles-Denis Bourbaki later died on 27 September 1897, and the dramatic story of his defeat entered the French consciousness.

  In the early 20th century, the First World War affected Europeans of all professions and social classes, including mathematicians and male students who fought and died in the front. For example, the French mathematician Gaston Julia, a pioneer in the study of fractals, lost his nose during the war and wore a leather strap over the affected part of his face for the rest of his life. The deaths of ENS students resulted in a lost generation in the French mathematical community; the estimated proportion of ENS mathematics students (and French students generally) who died in the war ranges from one-quarter to one-half, depending on the intervals of time (c. 1900–1918, especially 1910–1916) and populations considered. Furthermore, Bourbaki founder André Weil remarked in his memoir Apprenticeship of a Mathematician that France and Germany took different approaches with their intelligentsia during the war: while Germany protected its young students and scientists, France instead committed them to the front, owing to the French culture of egalitarianism.

A succeeding generation of mathematics students attended the ENS during the 1920s, including Weil and others, the future founders of Bourbaki. During his time as a student, Weil recalled a prank in which an upperclassman, posed as a professor and gave a math lecture, ending with a prompt: "Theorem of Bourbaki: you are to prove the following...". Weil was also aware of a similar stunt in which a student claimed to be from the fictional, impoverished nation of "Poldevia" and solicited the public for donations. Weil had strong interests in languages and Indian culture, having learned Sanskrit and read the Bhagavad Gita. After graduating from the ENS and obtaining his doctorate, Weil took a teaching stint at the Aligarh Muslim University in India. While there, Weil met the mathematician Damodar Kosambi, who was engaged in a power struggle with one of his colleagues. Weil suggested that Kosambi write an article with material attributed to one "Bourbaki", in order to show off his knowledge to the colleague. Kosambi took the suggestion, attributing the material discussed in the article to "the little-known Russian mathematician D. Bourbaki, who was poisoned during the Revolution." It was the first article in the mathematical literature with material attributed to the eponymous "Bourbaki". Weil's stay in India was short-lived; he attempted to revamp the mathematics department at Aligarh, without success. The university administration planned to fire Weil and promote his colleague Vijayaraghavan to the vacated position. However, Weil and Vijayaraghavan respected one another. Rather than play any role in the drama, Vijayaraghavan instead resigned, later informing Weil of the plan. Weil returned to Europe to seek another teaching position. He ended up at the University of Strasbourg, joining his friend and colleague Henri Cartan.

The Bourbaki collective

Founding
During their time together at Strasbourg, Weil and Cartan regularly complained to each other regarding the inadequacy of available course material for calculus instruction. In his memoir Apprenticeship, Weil described his solution in the following terms: "One winter day toward the end of 1934, I came upon a great idea that would put an end to these ceaseless interrogations by my comrade. 'We are five or six friends', I told him some time later, 'who are in charge of the same mathematics curriculum at various universities. Let us all come together and regulate these matters once and for all, and after this, I shall be delivered of these questions.' I was unaware of the fact that Bourbaki was born at that instant." Cartan confirmed the account.

The first, unofficial meeting of the Bourbaki collective took place at noon on Monday, 10 December 1934, at the Café Grill-Room A. Capoulade, Paris, in the Latin Quarter. Six mathematicians were present: Henri Cartan, Claude Chevalley, Jean Delsarte, Jean Dieudonné, René de Possel, and André Weil. Most of the group were based outside Paris and were in town to attend the Julia Seminar, a conference prepared with the help of Gaston Julia at which several future Bourbaki members and associates presented. The group resolved to collectively write a treatise on analysis, for the purpose of standardizing calculus instruction in French universities. The project was especially meant to supersede the text of Édouard Goursat, which the group found to be badly outdated, and to improve its treatment of Stokes' Theorem. The founders were also motivated by a desire to incorporate ideas from the Göttingen school, particularly from exponents Hilbert, Noether and B.L. van der Waerden. Further, in the aftermath of World War I, there was a certain nationalist impulse to save French mathematics from decline, especially in competition with Germany. As Dieudonné stated in an interview, "Without meaning to boast, I can say that it was Bourbaki that saved French mathematics from extinction."

Jean Delsarte was particularly favorable to the collective aspect of the proposed project, observing that such a working style could insulate the group's work against potential later individual claims of copyright. As various topics were discussed, Delsarte also suggested that the work begin in the most abstract, axiomatic terms possible, treating all of mathematics prerequisite to analysis from scratch. The group agreed to the idea, and this foundational area of the proposed work was referred to as the "Abstract Packet" (Paquet Abstrait). Working titles were adopted: the group styled itself as the Committee for the Treatise on Analysis, and their proposed work was called the Treatise on Analysis (Traité d'analyse). In all, the collective held ten preliminary biweekly meetings at A. Capoulade before its first official, founding conference in July 1935. During this early period, Paul Dubreil, Jean Leray and Szolem Mandelbrojt joined and participated. Dubreil and Leray left the meetings before the following summer, and were respectively replaced by new participants Jean Coulomb and Charles Ehresmann.

The group's official founding conference was held in Besse-en-Chandesse, from 10 to 17 July 1935. At the time of the official founding, the membership consisted of the six attendees at the first lunch of 10 December 1934, together with Coulomb, Ehresmann and Mandelbrojt. On 16 July, the members took a walk to alleviate the boredom of unproductive proceedings. During the malaise, some decided to skinny-dip in the nearby Lac Pavin, repeatedly yelling "Bourbaki!" At the close of the first official conference, the group renamed itself "Bourbaki", in reference to the general and prank as recalled by Weil and others. During 1935, the group also resolved to establish the mathematical personhood of their collective pseudonym by getting an article published under its name. A first name had to be decided; a full name was required for publication of any article. To this end, René de Possel's wife Eveline "baptized" the pseudonym with the first name of Nicolas, becoming Bourbaki's "godmother". This allowed for the publication of a second article with material attributed to Bourbaki, this time under "his" own name. Henri Cartan's father Élie Cartan, also a mathematician and supportive of the group, presented the article to the publishers, who accepted it.

At the time of Bourbaki's founding, René de Possel and his wife Eveline were in the process of divorcing. Eveline remarried to André Weil in 1937, and de Possel left the Bourbaki collective some time later. This sequence of events has caused speculation that de Possel left the group because of the remarriage, however this suggestion has also been criticized as possibly historically inaccurate, since de Possel is supposed to have remained active in Bourbaki for years after André's marriage to Eveline.

World War II

Bourbaki's work slowed significantly during the Second World War, though the group survived and later flourished. Some members of Bourbaki were Jewish and therefore forced to flee from certain parts of Europe at certain times. Weil, who was Jewish, spent the summer of 1939 in Finland with his wife Eveline, as guests of Lars Ahlfors. Due to their travel near the border, the couple were suspected as Soviet spies by Finnish authorities near the onset of the Winter War, and André was later arrested. According to an anecdote, Weil was to have been executed but for the passing mention of his case to Rolf Nevanlinna, who asked that Weil's sentence be commuted. However, the accuracy of this detail is dubious. Weil reached the United States in 1941, later taking another teaching stint in São Paulo from 1945 to 1947 before settling at the University of Chicago from 1947 to 1958 and finally the Institute for Advanced Study in Princeton, where he spent the remainder of his career. Although Weil remained in touch with the Bourbaki collective and visited Europe and the group periodically following the war, his level of involvement with Bourbaki never returned to that at the time of founding.

Second-generation Bourbaki member Laurent Schwartz was also Jewish and found pickup work as a math teacher in rural Vichy France. Moving from village to village, Schwartz planned his movements in order to evade capture by the Nazis. On one occasion Schwartz found himself trapped overnight in a certain village, as his expected transportation home was unavailable. There were two inns in town: a comfortable, well-appointed one, and a very poor one with no heating and bad beds. Schwartz's instinct told him to stay at the poor inn; overnight, the Nazis raided the good inn, leaving the poor inn unchecked.

Meanwhile, Jean Delsarte, a Catholic, was mobilized in 1939 as the captain of an audio reconnaissance battery. He was forced to lead the unit's retreat from the northeastern part of France toward the south. While passing near the Swiss border, Delsarte overheard a soldier say "We are the army of Bourbaki"; the 19th-century general's retreat was known to the French. Delsarte had coincidentally led a retreat similar to that of the collective's namesake.

Postwar until the present

Following the war, Bourbaki had solidified the plan of its work and settled into a productive routine. Bourbaki regularly published volumes of the Éléments during the 1950s and 1960s, and enjoyed its greatest influence during this period. Over time the founding members gradually left the group, slowly being replaced with younger newcomers including Jean-Pierre Serre and Alexander Grothendieck. Serre, Grothendieck and Laurent Schwartz were awarded the Fields Medal during the postwar period, in 1954, 1966 and 1950 respectively. Later members Alain Connes and Jean-Christophe Yoccoz also received the Fields Medal, in 1982 and 1994 respectively.

The later practice of accepting scientific awards contrasted with some of the founders' views. During the 1930s, Weil and Delsarte petitioned against a French national scientific "medal system" proposed by the Nobel physics laureate Jean Perrin. Weil and Delsarte felt that the institution of such a system would increase unconstructive pettiness and jealousy in the scientific community. Despite this, the Bourbaki group had previously successfully petitioned Perrin for a government grant to support its normal operations. Like the founders, Grothendieck was also averse to awards, albeit for pacifist reasons. Although Grothendieck was awarded the Fields Medal in 1966, he declined to attend the ceremony in Moscow, in protest of the Soviet government. In 1988, Grothendieck rejected the Crafoord Prize outright, citing no personal need to accept prize money, lack of recent relevant output, and general distrust of the scientific community.

Born to Jewish anarchist parentage, Grothendieck survived the Holocaust and advanced rapidly in the French mathematical community, despite poor education during the war. Grothendieck's teachers included Bourbaki's founders, and so he joined the group. During Grothendieck's membership, Bourbaki reached an impasse concerning its foundational approach. Grothendieck advocated for a reformulation of the group's work using category theory as its theoretical basis, as opposed to set theory. The proposal was ultimately rejected in part because the group had already committed itself to a rigid track of sequential presentation, with multiple already-published volumes. Following this, Grothendieck left Bourbaki "in anger". Biographers of the collective have described Bourbaki's unwillingness to start over in terms of category theory as a missed opportunity.

During the founding period, the group chose the Parisian publisher Hermann to issue installments of the Éléments. Hermann was led by Enrique Freymann, a friend of the founders willing to publish the group's project, despite financial risk. During the 1970s, Bourbaki entered a protracted legal battle with Hermann over matters of copyright and royalty payment. Although the Bourbaki group won the suit and retained collective copyright of the Éléments, the dispute slowed the group's productivity. Former member Pierre Cartier described the lawsuit as a pyrrhic victory, saying: "As usual in legal battles, both parties lost and the lawyer got rich." Later editions of the Éléments were published by Masson, and modern editions are published by Springer. From the 1980s through the 2000s, Bourbaki published very infrequently, with the result that in 1998 Le Monde pronounced the collective "dead". However, in the 2010s Bourbaki resumed publication of the Éléments with a revised chapter on algebra, the first 4 chapters of a new book on algebraic topology and the first two chapters of a new expanded edition on spectral theory.

Working method

Bourbaki holds periodic conferences for the purpose of expanding the Éléments; these conferences are the central activity of the group's working life. Subcommittees are assigned to write drafts on specific material, and the drafts are later presented, vigorously debated, and re-drafted at the conferences. Unanimous agreement is required before any material is deemed acceptable for publication. A given piece of material may require six or more drafts over a period of several years, and some drafts are never developed into completed work. Bourbaki's writing process has therefore been described as "Sisyphean". Although the method is slow, it yields a final product which satisfies the group's standards for mathematical rigour, one of Bourbaki's main priorities in the treatise. Bourbaki's emphasis on rigour was a reaction to the style of Henri Poincaré, who stressed the importance of free-flowing mathematical intuition at the cost of thorough presentation. During the project's early years, Dieudonné served as the group's scribe, authoring several final drafts which were ultimately published. For this purpose, Dieudonné adopted an impersonal writing style which was not his own, but which was used to craft material acceptable to the entire group. Dieudonné reserved his personal style for his own work; like all members of Bourbaki, Dieudonné also published material under his own name, including the nine-volume Éléments d'analyse, a work explicitly focused on analysis and of a piece with Bourbaki's initial intentions.

Most of the final drafts of Bourbaki's Éléments carefully avoided using illustrations, favoring a formal presentation based only in text and formulas. An exception to this was the treatment of Lie groups and Lie algebras (especially in chapters 4–6), which did make use of diagrams and illustrations. The inclusion of illustration in this part of the work was due to Armand Borel. Borel was minority-Swiss in a majority-French collective, and self-deprecated as "the Swiss peasant", explaining that visual learning was important to the Swiss national character. When asked about the dearth of illustration in the work, former member Pierre Cartier replied:

The conferences have historically been held at quiet rural areas. These locations contrast with the lively, sometimes heated debates which have occurred. Laurent Schwartz reported an episode in which Weil slapped Cartan on the head with a draft. The hotel's proprietor saw the incident and assumed that the group would split up, but according to Schwartz, "peace was restored within ten minutes." The historical, confrontational style of debate within Bourbaki has been partly attributed to Weil, who believed that new ideas have a better chance of being born in confrontation than in an orderly discussion. Schwartz related another illustrative incident: Dieudonné was adamant that topological vector spaces must appear in the work before integration, and whenever anyone suggested that the order be reversed, he would loudly threaten his resignation. This became an in-joke among the group; Roger Godement's wife Sonia attended a conference, aware of the idea, and asked for proof. As Sonia arrived at a meeting, a member suggested that integration must appear before topological vector spaces, which triggered Dieudonné's usual reaction.

Despite the historical culture of heated argument, Bourbaki thrived during the middle of the twentieth century. Bourbaki's ability to sustain such a collective, critical approach has been described as "something unusual", surprising even its own members. In founder Henri Cartan's words, "That a final product can be obtained at all is a kind of miracle that none of us can explain." It has been suggested that the group survived because its members believed strongly in the importance of their collective project, despite personal differences. When the group overcame difficulties or developed an idea that they liked, they would sometimes say l'esprit a soufflé ("the spirit breathes"). Historian Liliane Beaulieu noted that the "spirit"—which might be an avatar, the group mentality in action, or Bourbaki "himself"—was part of an internal culture and mythology which the group used to form its identity and perform work.

Humor

Humor has been an important aspect of the group's culture, beginning with Weil's memories of the student pranks involving "Bourbaki" and "Poldevia". For example, in 1939 the group released a wedding announcement for the marriage of "Betti Bourbaki" (daughter of Nicolas) to one "H. Pétard" (H. "Firecrackers" or "Hector Pétard"), a "lion hunter". Hector Pétard was itself a pseudonym, but not one originally coined by the Bourbaki members. The Pétard moniker was originated by Ralph P. Boas, Frank Smithies and other Princeton mathematicians who were aware of the Bourbaki project; inspired by them, the Princeton mathematicians published an article on the "mathematics of lion hunting". After meeting Boas and Smithies, Weil composed the wedding announcement, which contained several mathematical puns. Bourbaki's internal newsletter La Tribu has sometimes been issued with humorous subtitles to describe a given conference, such as "The Extraordinary Congress of Old Fogies" (where anyone older than 30 was considered a fogy) or "The Congress of the Motorization of the Trotting Ass" (an expression used to describe the routine unfolding of a mathematical proof, or process).

During the 1940s–1950s, the American Mathematical Society received applications for individual membership from Bourbaki. They were rebuffed by J.R. Kline who understood the entity to be a collective, inviting them to re-apply for institutional membership. In response, Bourbaki floated a rumor that Ralph Boas was not a real person, but a collective pseudonym of the editors of Mathematical Reviews with which Boas had been affiliated. The reason for targeting Boas was because he had known the group in its earlier days when they were less strict with secrecy, and he'd described them as a collective in an article for the Encyclopædia Britannica. In November 1968, a mock obituary of Nicolas Bourbaki was released during one of the seminars.

The group developed some variants of the word "Bourbaki" for internal use. The noun "Bourbaki" might refer to the group proper or to an individual member, e.g. "André Weil was a Bourbaki." "Bourbakist" is sometimes used to refer to members but also denotes associates, supporters, and enthusiasts. To "bourbakize" meant to take a poor existing text and to improve it through an editing process.

Bourbaki's culture of humor has been described as an important factor in the group's social cohesion and capacity to survive, smoothing over tensions of heated debate.

Works

Bourbaki's work includes a series of textbooks, a series of printed lecture notes, journal articles, and an internal newsletter. The textbook series Éléments de mathématique (Elements of mathematics) is the group's central work. The Séminaire Bourbaki is a lecture series held regularly under the group's auspices, and the talks given are also published as lecture notes. Journal articles have been published with authorship attributed to Bourbaki, and the group publishes an internal newsletter La Tribu (The Tribe) which is distributed to current and former members.

Éléments de mathématique

The content of the Éléments is divided into books—major topics of discussion, volumes—individual, physical books, and chapters, together with certain summaries of results, historical notes, and other details. The volumes of the Éléments have had a complex publication history. Material has been revised for new editions, published chronologically out of order of its intended logical sequence, grouped together and partitioned differently in later volumes, and translated into English. For example, the second book on Algebra was originally released in eight French volumes: the first in 1942 being chapter 1 alone, and the last in 1980 being chapter 10 alone. This presentation was later condensed into five volumes with chapters 1–3 in the first volume, chapters 4–7 in the second, and chapters 8–10 each remaining the third through fifth volumes of that portion of the work.

When Bourbaki's founders began working on the Éléments, they originally conceived of it as a "treatise on analysis", the proposed work having a working title of the same name (Traité d'analyse). The opening part was to comprehensively deal with the foundations of mathematics prior to analysis, and was referred to as the "Abstract Packet". Over time, the members developed this proposed "opening section" of the work to the point that it would instead run for several volumes and comprise a major part of the work, covering set theory, abstract algebra, and topology. Once the project's scope expanded far beyond its original purpose, the working title Traité d'analyse was dropped in favor of Éléments de mathématique. The unusual, singular "Mathematic" was meant to connote Bourbaki's belief in the unity of mathematics.  The first six books of the Éléments, representing the first half of the work, are numbered sequentially and ordered logically, with a given statement being established only on the basis of earlier results.  This first half of the work bore the subtitle Les structures fondamentales de l’analyse (Fundamental Structures of Analysis), covering established mathematics (algebra, analysis) in the group's style.  The second half of the work consists of unnumbered books treating modern areas of research (Lie groups, commutative algebra), each presupposing the first half as a shared foundation but without dependence on each other.  This second half of the work, consisting of newer research topics, does not have a corresponding subtitle.

The volumes of the Éléments published by Hermann were indexed by chronology of publication and referred to as fascicules: installments in a large work. Some volumes did not consist of the normal definitions, proofs, and exercises in a math textbook, but contained only summaries of results for a given topic, stated without proof. These volumes were referred to as Fascicules de résultats, with the result that fascicule may refer to a volume of Hermann's edition, or to one of the "summary" sections of the work (e.g. Fascicules de résultats is translated as "Summary of Results" rather than "Installment of Results", referring to the content rather than a specific volume). The first volume of Bourbaki's Éléments to be published was the Summary of Results in the Theory of Sets, in 1939. Similarly one of the work's later books, Differential and Analytic Manifolds, consisted only of two volumes of summaries of results, with no chapters of content having been published.

Later installments of the Éléments appeared infrequently during the 1980s and 1990s. A volume of Commutative Algebra (chapters 8–9) was published in 1983, and no other volumes were issued until the appearance of the same book's tenth chapter in 1998. During the 2010s, Bourbaki increased its productivity. A re-written and expanded version of the eighth chapter of Algebra appeared in 2012, the first four chapters of a new book treating Algebraic Topology was published in 2016, and the first two chapters of a revised and expanded edition of Spectral Theory was issued in 2019 with the remaining three (completely new) chapters appearing in spring 2023.

Séminaire Bourbaki

The Séminaire Bourbaki has been held regularly since 1948, and lectures are presented by non-members and members of the collective. As of  the Séminaire Bourbaki has run to over a thousand recorded lectures in its written incarnation, denoted chronologically by simple numbers. At the time of a June 1999 lecture given by Jean-Pierre Serre on the topic of Lie groups, the total lectures given in the series numbered 864, corresponding to roughly 10,000 pages of printed material.

Articles

Several journal articles have appeared in the mathematical literature with material or authorship attributed to Bourbaki; unlike the Éléments, they were typically written by individual members and not crafted through the usual process of group consensus. Despite this, Jean Dieudonné's essay "The Architecture of Mathematics" has become known as Bourbaki's manifesto. Dieudonné addressed the issue of overspecialization in mathematics, to which he opposed the inherent unity of mathematic (as opposed to mathematics) and proposed mathematical structures as useful tools which can be applied to several subjects, showing their common features. To illustrate the idea, Dieudonné described three different systems in arithmetic and geometry and showed that all could be described as examples of a group, a specific kind of (algebraic) structure. Dieudonné described the axiomatic method as "the 'Taylor system' for mathematics" in the sense that it could be used to solve problems efficiently. Such a procedure would entail identifying relevant structures and applying established knowledge about the given structure to the specific problem at hand.
  Kosambi attributed material in the article to "D. Bourbaki", the first mention of the eponymous Bourbaki in the literature.
  Presumptive author: André Weil.
  Presumptive author: Jean Dieudonné.
  Presumptive author: Jean Dieudonné. Second in a series of three articles.
  Presumptive author: Jean Dieudonné or André Weil.
  Presumptive author: Jean Dieudonné.
  Presumptive author: André Weil.
  Presumptive author: Henri Cartan or Jean Dieudonné.
  Presumptive author: Jean Dieudonné. Authorized translation of the book chapter L'architecture des mathématiques, appearing in English as a journal article.
  Presumptive authors: Jean Dieudonné and Laurent Schwartz.

La Tribu

La Tribu is Bourbaki's internal newsletter, distributed to current and former members. The newsletter usually documents recent conferences and activity in a humorous, informal way, sometimes including poetry. Member Pierre Samuel wrote the newsletter's narrative sections for several years. Early editions of La Tribu and related documents have been made publicly available by Bourbaki.

Historian Liliane Beaulieu examined La Tribu and Bourbaki's other writings, describing the group's humor and private language as an "art of memory" which is specific to the group and its chosen methods of operation. Because of the group's secrecy and informal organization, individual memories are sometimes recorded in a fragmentary way, and may not have significance to other members. On the other hand, the predominantly French, ENS background of the members, together with stories of the group's early period and successes, create a shared culture and mythology which is drawn upon for group identity. La Tribu usually lists the members present at a conference, together with any visitors, family members or other friends in attendance. Humorous descriptions of location or local "props" (cars, bicycles, binoculars, etc.) can also serve as mnemonic devices.

Membership

As of 2000, Bourbaki has had "about forty" members. Historically the group has numbered about ten to twelve members at any given point, although it was briefly (and officially) limited to nine members at the time of founding. Bourbaki's membership has been described in terms of generations:

After the first three generations there were roughly twenty later members, not including current participants. Bourbaki has a custom of keeping its current membership secret, a practice meant to ensure that its output is presented as a collective, unified effort under the Bourbaki pseudonym, not attributable to any one author (e.g. for purposes of copyright or royalty payment). This secrecy is also intended to deter unwanted attention which could disrupt normal operations. However, former members freely discuss Bourbaki's internal practices upon departure.

Prospective members are invited to conferences and styled as guinea pigs, a process meant to vet the newcomer's mathematical ability. In the event of agreement between the group and the prospect, the prospect eventually becomes a full member. The group is supposed to have an age limit: active members are expected to retire at (or about) 50 years of age. At a 1956 conference, Cartan read a letter from Weil which proposed a "gradual disappearance" of the founding members, forcing younger members to assume full responsibility for Bourbaki's operations. This rule is supposed to have resulted in a complete change of personnel by 1958. However, historian Liliane Beaulieu has been critical of the claim. She reported never having found written affirmation of the rule, and has indicated that there have been exceptions. The age limit is thought to express the founders' intent that the project should continue indefinitely, operated by people at their best mathematical ability—in the mathematical community, there is a widespread belief that mathematicians produce their best work while young. Among full members there is no official hierarchy; all operate as equals, having the ability to interrupt conference proceedings at any point, or to challenge any material presented. However, André Weil has been described as "first among equals" during the founding period, and was given some deference. On the other hand, the group has also poked fun at the idea that older members should be afforded greater respect.

Bourbaki conferences have also been attended by members' family, friends, visiting mathematicians, and other non-members of the group. Bourbaki is not known ever to have had any female members.

Influence and criticism

Bourbaki was influential in 20th century mathematics and had some interdisciplinary impact on the humanities and the arts, although the extent of the latter influence is a matter of dispute. The group has been praised and criticized for its method of presentation, its working style, and its choice of mathematical topics.

Influence

Bourbaki introduced several mathematical notations which have remained in use. Weil took the letter  of the Norwegian alphabet and used it to denote the empty set, . This notation first appeared in the Summary of Results on the Theory of Sets, and remains in use. The words injective, surjective and bijective were introduced to refer to functions which satisfy certain properties. Bourbaki used simple language for certain geometric objects, naming them pavés (paving stones) and boules (balls) as opposed to "parallelotopes" or "hyperspheroids". Similarly in its treatment of topological vector spaces, Bourbaki defined a barrel as a set which is convex, balanced, absorbing, and closed. The group were proud of this definition, believing that the shape of a wine barrel typified the mathematical object's properties. Bourbaki also employed a "dangerous bend" symbol  in the margins of its text to indicate an especially difficult piece of material. Bourbaki enjoyed its greatest influence during the 1950s and 1960s, when installments of the Éléments were published frequently.

Bourbaki had some interdisciplinary influence on other fields, including anthropology and psychology. This influence was in the context of structuralism, a school of thought in the humanities which stresses the relationships between objects over the objects themselves, pursued in various fields by other French intellectuals. In 1943, André Weil met the anthropologist Claude Lévi-Strauss in New York, where the two undertook a brief collaboration. At Lévi-Strauss' request, Weil wrote a brief appendix describing marriage rules for four classes of people within Australian aboriginal society, using a mathematical model based on group theory. The result was published as an appendix in Lévi-Strauss' Elementary Structures of Kinship, a work examining family structures and the incest taboo in human cultures. In 1952, Jean Dieudonné and Jean Piaget participated in an interdisciplinary conference on mathematical and mental structures. Dieudonné described mathematical "mother structures" in terms of Bourbaki's project: composition, neighborhood, and order. Piaget then gave a talk on children's mental processes, and considered that the psychological concepts he had just described were very similar to the mathematical ones just described by Dieudonné. According to Piaget, the two were "impressed with each other". The psychoanalyst Jacques Lacan liked Bourbaki's collaborative working style and proposed a similar collective group in psychology, an idea which did not materialize.

Bourbaki was also cited by post-structuralist philosophers. In their joint work Anti-Oedipus, Gilles Deleuze and Félix Guattari presented a criticism of capitalism. The authors cited Bourbaki's use of the axiomatic method (with the purpose of establishing truth) as a distinct counter-example to management processes which instead seek economic efficiency. The authors said of Bourbaki's axiomatics that "they do not form a Taylor system", inverting the phrase used by Dieudonné in "The Architecture of Mathematics". In The Postmodern Condition, Jean-François Lyotard criticized the "legitimation of knowledge", the process by which statements become accepted as valid. As an example, Lyotard cited Bourbaki as a group which produces knowledge within a given system of rules. Lyotard contrasted Bourbaki's hierarchical, "structuralist" mathematics with the catastrophe theory of René Thom and the fractals of Benoit Mandelbrot, expressing preference for the latter "postmodern science" which problematized mathematics with "fracta, catastrophes, and pragmatic paradoxes".

Although biographer Amir Aczel stressed Bourbaki's influence on other disciplines during the mid-20th century, Maurice Mashaal moderated the claims of Bourbaki's influence in the following terms:

The impact of "structuralism" on mathematics itself was also criticized. The mathematical historian Leo Corry argued that Bourbaki's use of mathematical structures was unimportant within the Éléments, having been established in Theory of Sets and cited infrequently afterwards. Corry described the "structural" view of mathematics promoted by Bourbaki as an "image of knowledge"—a conception about a scientific discipline—as opposed to an item in the discipline's "body of knowledge", which refers to the actual scientific results in the discipline itself.

Bourbaki also had some influence in the arts. The literary collective Oulipo was founded on 24 November 1960 under circumstances similar to Bourbaki's founding, with the members initially meeting in a restaurant. Although several members of Oulipo were mathematicians, the group's purpose was to create experimental literature by playing with language. Oulipo frequently employed mathematically-based constrained writing techniques, such as the S+7 method. Oulipo member Raymond Queneau attended a Bourbaki conference in 1962.

In 2016, an anonymous group of economists collaboratively wrote a note alleging academic misconduct by the authors and editor of a paper published in the American Economic Review. The note was published under the name Nicolas Bearbaki in homage to Nicolas Bourbaki.

In 2018, the American musical duo Twenty One Pilots released a concept album named Trench. The album's conceptual framework was the mythical city of "Dema" ruled by nine "bishops"; one of the bishops was named "Nico", short for Nicolas Bourbaki.  Another of the bishops was named Andre, which may refer to André Weil.  Following the album's release, there was a spike in internet searches for "Nicolas Bourbaki".

Praise

Bourbaki's work has been praised by some mathematicians. In a book review, Emil Artin described the Éléments in broad, positive terms:

Among the volumes of the Éléments, Bourbaki's work on Lie Groups and Lie Algebras has been identified as "excellent", having become a standard reference on the topic. In particular, former member Armand Borel described the volume with chapters 4–6 as "one of the most successful books by Bourbaki". The success of this part of the work has been attributed to the fact that the books were composed while leading experts on the topic were Bourbaki members.

Jean-Pierre Bourguignon expressed appreciation for the Séminaire Bourbaki, saying that he'd learned a large amount of material at its lectures, and referred to its printed lecture notes regularly. He also praised the Éléments for containing "some superb and very clever proofs".

Criticism

Bourbaki has also been criticized by several mathematicians—including its own former members—for a variety of reasons. Criticisms have included the choice of presentation of certain topics within the Éléments at the expense of others, dislike of the method of presentation for given topics, dislike of the group's working style, and a perceived elitist mentality around Bourbaki's project and its books, especially during the collective's most productive years in the 1950s and 1960s.

Bourbaki's deliberations on the Éléments resulted in the inclusion of some topics, while others were not treated. When asked in a 1997 interview about topics left out of the Éléments, former member Pierre Cartier replied:

Although Bourbaki had resolved to treat mathematics from its foundations, the group's eventual solution in terms of set theory was attended by several problems. Bourbaki's members were mathematicians as opposed to logicians, and therefore the collective had a limited interest in mathematical logic. As Bourbaki's members themselves said of the book on set theory, it was written "with pain and without pleasure, but we had to do it." Dieudonné personally remarked elsewhere that ninety-five percent of mathematicians "don't care a fig" for mathematical logic. In response, logician Adrian Mathias harshly criticized Bourbaki's foundational framework, noting that it did not take Gödel's results into account.

Bourbaki also influenced the New Math, a failed reform in Western mathematics education at the elementary and secondary levels, which stressed abstraction over concrete examples. During the mid-20th century, reform in basic math education was spurred by a perceived need to create a mathematically literate workforce for the modern economy, and also to compete with the Soviet Union. In France, this led to the Lichnerowicz Commission of 1967, headed by André Lichnerowicz and including some (then-current and former) Bourbaki members. Although Bourbaki members had previously (and individually) reformed math instruction at the university level, they had less direct involvement with implementation of the New Math at the primary and secondary levels. New Math reforms resulted in instructional material which was incomprehensible to both students and teachers, failing to meet the cognitive needs of younger students. The attempted reform was harshly criticized by Dieudonné and also by brief founding Bourbaki participant Jean Leray. Apart from French mathematicians, the French reforms also met with harsh criticism from Soviet-born mathematician Vladimir Arnold, who argued that in his time as a student and teacher in Moscow, the teaching of mathematics was firmly rooted in analysis and geometry, and interweaved with problems from classical mechanics; hence, the French reforms cannot be a legitimate attempt to emulate Soviet scientific education. In 1997, while speaking to a conference on mathematical teaching in Paris, he commented on Bourbaki by stating: "genuine mathematicians do not gang up, but the weak need gangs in order to survive." and suggested that Bourbaki's bonding over "super-abstractness" was similar to groups of mathematicians in the 19th century who had bonded over anti-Semitism.

Dieudonné later regretted that Bourbaki's success had contributed to a snobbery for pure mathematics in France, at the expense of applied mathematics. In an interview, he said: "It is possible to say that there was no serious applied mathematics in France for forty years after Poincaré. There was even a snobbery for pure math. When one noticed a talented student, one would tell him 'You should do pure math.' On the other hand, one would advise a mediocre student to do applied math while thinking, "It's all that he can do! ... The truth is actually the reverse. You can't do good work in applied math until you can do good work in pure math." Claude Chevalley confirmed an elitist culture within Bourbaki, describing it as "an absolute certainty of our superiority over other mathematicians." Alexander Grothendieck also confirmed an elitist mentality within Bourbaki. Some mathematicians, especially geometers and applied mathematicians, found Bourbaki's influence to be stifling. Benoit Mandelbrot's decision to emigrate to the United States in 1958 was motivated in part by a desire to escape Bourbaki's influence in France.

Several related criticisms of the Éléments have concerned its target audience and the intent of its presentation. Volumes of the Éléments begin with a note to the reader which says that the series "takes up mathematics at the beginning, and gives complete proofs" and that "the method of exposition we have chosen is axiomatic and abstract, and normally proceeds from the general to the particular." Despite the opening language, Bourbaki's intended audience are not absolute beginners in mathematics, but rather undergraduates, graduate students, and professors who are familiar with mathematical concepts. Claude Chevalley said that the Éléments are "useless for a beginner", and Pierre Cartier clarified that "The misunderstanding was that it should be a textbook for everybody. That was the big disaster."

The work is divided into two halves. While the first half—the Structures fondamentales de l’analyse—treats established subjects, the second half deals with modern research areas like commutative algebra and spectral theory. This divide in the work is related to a historical change in the intent of the treatise. The Éléments' content consists of theorems, proofs, exercises and related commentary, common material in math textbooks. Despite this presentation, the first half was not written as original research but rather as a reorganized presentation of established knowledge. In this sense, the Éléments''' first half was more akin to an encyclopedia than a textbook series. As Cartier remarked, "The misunderstanding was that many people thought it should be taught the way it was written in the books. You can think of the first books of Bourbaki as an encyclopedia of mathematics... If you consider it as a textbook, it's a disaster."

The strict, ordered presentation of material in the Éléments' first half was meant to form the basis for any further additions. However, developments in modern mathematical research have proven difficult to adapt in terms of Bourbaki's organizational scheme. This difficulty has been attributed to the fluid, dynamic nature of ongoing research which, being new, is not settled or fully understood. Bourbaki's style has been described as a particular scientific paradigm which has been superseded in a paradigm shift. For example, Ian Stewart cited Vaughan Jones' novel work in knot theory as an example of topology which was done without dependence on Bourbaki's system. Bourbaki's influence has declined over time; this decline has been partly attributed to the absence of certain modern topics—such as category theory—from the treatise.

Although multiple criticisms have pointed to shortcomings in the collective's project, one has also pointed to its strength: Bourbaki was a "victim of its own success" in the sense that it accomplished what it set out to do, achieving its original goal of presenting a thorough treatise on modern mathematics. These factors prompted biographer Maurice Mashaal to conclude his treatment of Bourbaki in the following terms:

See also
 Bourbaki–Witt theorem
 Jacobson–Bourbaki theorem
 Secret society

Other collective mathematical pseudonyms
 Arthur Besse
 Blanche Descartes
 John Rainwater
 G. W. Peck

Notes

Bibliography
 
 
 
 
 
  Presumptive author: Jean Dieudonné. Authorized translation of the book chapter L'architecture des mathématiques'', appearing in English as a journal article.

References

External links
 Official Website of L'Association des Collaborateurs de Nicolas Bourbaki 
 Archives of the association 

 
1934 establishments in France
1935 establishments in France
Academic shared pseudonyms
French mathematicians
Mathematics textbooks
Large-scale mathematical formalization projects
Organizations established in 1934
Organizations established in 1935
Pseudonymous mathematicians
Secret societies in France